Psychogeography is the exploration of urban environments that emphasizes interpersonal connections to places and arbitrary routes. It was developed by members of the Letterist International and Situationist International, which were revolutionary groups influenced by Marxist and anarchist theory as well as the attitudes and methods of Dadaists and Surrealists. In 1955, Guy Debord defined psychogeography as "the study of the precise laws and specific effects of the geographical environment, consciously organized or not, on the emotions and behavior of individuals." One of the key tactics for exploring psychogeography is the loosely defined urban walking practice known as the dérive. As a practice and theory, psychogeography has influenced a broad set of cultural actors, including artists, activists and academics.

Development

Psychogeography was originally developed by the Lettrist International 'around the summer of 1953'. Debord describes psychogeography as 'charmingly vague' and emphasises the importance of practice in psychogeographical explorations. The first published discussion of psychogeography was in the Lettrist journal Potlatch (1954), which included a 'Psychogeographical Game of the Week':Depending on what you are after, choose an area, a more or less populous city, a more or less lively street. Build a house. Furnish it. Make the most of its decoration and surroundings. Choose the season and the time. Gather together the right people, the best records and drinks. Lighting and conversation must, of course, be appropriate, along with the weather and your memories.

If your calculations are correct, you should find the outcome satisfying. (Please inform the editors of the results.)The Lettrists' reimagining of the city has its precursors in aspects of Dadaism and Surrealism. The concept of the flâneur, first created by Charles Baudelaire, and further developed by Walter Benjamin, is also cited as an influence on the development of psychogeography.:3;18

Ivan Chtcheglov, in his highly influential 1953 essay "Formulaire pour un urbanisme nouveau" ("Formulary for a New Urbanism"), established many of the concepts that would inform the development of psychogeography. Forwarding a theory of unitary urbanism, Chtcheglov wrote "Architecture is the simplest means of articulating time and space, of modulating reality, of engendering dreams".  Similarly, the Situationists found contemporary architecture both physically and ideologically restrictive, combining with outside cultural influence, effectively creating an undertow, and forcing oneself into a certain system of interaction with their environment: "[C]ities have a psychogeographical relief, with constant currents, fixed points and vortexes which strongly discourage entry into or exit from certain zones". Following Chtcheglov's exclusion from the Lettrists in 1954, Guy Debord and others worked to clarify the concept of unitary urbanism, in a bid to demand a revolutionary approach to architecture.

The Situationists' response was to create designs of new urbanized space, promising better opportunities for experimenting through mundane expression.  Their intentions remained completely as abstractions.  Guy Debord's truest intention was to unify two different factors of "ambiance" that, he felt, determined the values of the urban landscape: the soft ambiance — light, sound, time, the association of ideas — with the hard, the actual physical constructions.  Debord's vision was a combination of the two realms of opposing ambiance, where the play of the soft ambiance was actively considered in the rendering of the hard.  The new space creates a possibility for activity not formerly determined by one besides the individual.

At a conference in Cosio di Arroscia, Italy in 1956, the Lettrists joined the International Movement for an Imaginist Bauhaus to set a proper definition for the idea announced by Gil J. Wolman: "Unitary Urbanism - the synthesis of art and technology that we call for — must be constructed according to certain new values of life, values which now need to be distinguished and disseminated."  It demanded the rejection of functional, Euclidean values in architecture, as well as the separation between art and its surroundings. The implication of combining these two negations is that by creating abstraction, one creates art, which, in turn, creates a point of distinction that unitary urbanism insists must be nullified.  This confusion is also fundamental to the execution of unitary urbanism as it corrupts one's ability to identify where "function" ends and "play" (the "ludic") begins, resulting in what the Lettrist International and Situationist International believed to be a utopia where one was constantly exploring, free of determining factors.

One of the first collaborations between Debord and Danish Asger Jorn is their screen printed Guide psychogéographique de Paris: discours sur les passions de l’armour (Psychogeographic Guide of
Paris: 1957). Later they created The Naked City (psychogeographic map of Paris:1958), for which they cut apart a typical map of Paris and repositioned the pieces. The resulting map corresponded with parts of Paris that were ‘stimulating’ and “worthy of study and preservation”; they then drew red arrows between these parts of the city to represent the fastest and most direct connections from one place to another, preferably made by taxi, as it was seen as the most independent and free way to travel through the city as opposed to buses.

Eventually, Debord and Asger Jorn resigned themselves to the fate of "urban relativity".  Debord readily admits in his 1961 film A Critique of Separation, "The sectors of a city…are decipherable, but the personal meaning they have for us is incommunicable, as is the secrecy of private life in general, regarding which we possess nothing but pitiful documents".  Despite the ambiguity of the theory, Debord committed himself firmly to its practical basis in reality, even as he later confesses, "none of this is very clear. It is a completely typical drunken monologue…with its vain phrases that do not await response and its overbearing explanations. And its silences." "This apparently serious term 'psychogeography'", writes Debord biographer Vincent Kaufman, "comprises an art of conversation and drunkenness, and everything leads us to believe that Debord excelled at both.":114

Before settling on the impossibility of true psychogeography, Debord made another film, On the Passage of a Few Persons Through a Rather Brief Unity of Time (1959). The film's narrated content concerns itself with the evolution of a generally passive group of unnamed people into a fully aware, anarchistic assemblage, and might be perceived as a biography of the situationists themselves. Among the rants which construct the film (regarding art, ignorance, consumerism, militarism) is a desperate call for psychogeographic action:

Moments later, Debord elaborates on the important goals of unitary urbanism in contemporary society:

Quoting Karl Marx, Debord says:

While a reading of the texts included in the journal Internationale Situationniste may lead to an understanding of psychogeography as dictated by Guy Debord, a more comprehensive elucidation of the term would come from research into those who have put its techniques into a more developed practise.  While Debord's influence in bringing Chtchglov's text to an international audience is undoubted, his skill with the 'praxis' of unitary urbanism has been placed into question by almost all of the subsequent protagonists of the Formulary's directives.   Debord was indeed a notorious drunk (see his Panegyrique, Gallimard 1995) and this altered state of consciousness must be considered along with assertions he made regarding his attempts at psychogeographical activities such as dérive and constructed situation.  The researches undertaken by WNLA, AAA and the London Psychogeographical Association during the 1990s support the contention of Asger Jorn and the Scandinavian Situationniste (Drakagygett 1962 - 1998) that the psychogeographical is a concept only known through practise of its techniques. Without undertaking the programme expounded by Chtchglov, and the resultant submission to the urban unknown, comprehension of the Formulary is not possible. As Debord himself suggested, an understanding of the 'beautiful language' of situationist urbanism necessitates its practice.

Dérive

Along with détournement, one of the main Situationist practices is the dérive ("drift"). The dérive is a method of drifting through space to explore how the city is constructed, as well as how it makes us feel. Guy Debord defined the dérive as "a mode of experimental behavior linked to the conditions of urban society: a technique of rapid passage through varied ambiances." He gave a fuller explanation in "Theory of the Dérive" (1956), first written as a member of the Letterist International: In a dérive one or more persons during a certain period drop their usual motives for movement and action, their relations, their work and leisure activities, and let themselves be drawn by the attractions of the terrain and the encounters they find there… But the dérive includes both this letting go and its necessary contradiction: the domination of psychogeographical variations by the knowledge and calculation of their possibilities.The dérive's goals include studying the terrain of the city (psychogeography) and emotional disorientation, both of which lead to the potential creation of Situations.

Contemporary psychogeography

Since the 1990s, as situationist theory became popular in artistic and academic circles, avant-garde, neoist, and revolutionary groups emerged, developing psychogeographical praxis in various ways. Influenced primarily through the re-emergence of the London Psychogeographical Association and the foundation of The Workshop for Non-Linear Architecture, these groups have assisted in the development of a contemporary psychogeography. Between 1992 and 1996 The Workshop for Non-Linear Architecture undertook an extensive programme of practical research into classic (situationist) psychogeography in both Glasgow and London. The discoveries made during this period, documented in the group's journal Viscosity, expanded the terrain of the psychogeographic into that of urban design and architectural performance. Morag Rose has identified three dominant strands in contemporary psychogeography: literary, activist and creative.:29

The journal Transgressions: A Journal of Urban Exploration (which appears to have ceased publication sometime in 2000) collated and developed a number of post-avant-garde revolutionary psychogeographical themes. The journal also contributed to the use and development of psychogeographical maps which have, since 2000, been used in political actions, drifts and projections, distributed as flyers. Since 2003 in the United States, separate events known as Provflux and Psy-Geo-conflux have been dedicated to action-based participatory experiments, under the academic umbrella of psychogeography. An article on the second annual Psy-Geo-conflux described psychogeography as "a slightly stuffy term that's been applied to a whole toy box full of playful, inventive strategies for exploring cities."

Psychogeography also become a device used in literature. In Britain in particular, psychogeography has become a recognised descriptive term used in discussion of successful writers such as Iain Sinclair and Peter Ackroyd. Sinclair is '[a]rguably the most high-profile British psychogeographer' and is credited with having a strong influence on the term's greater public use in the United Kingdom.:9 Though Sinclair makes infrequent use of the jargon associated with the Situationists, he has certainly popularized the term by producing a large body of work based on pedestrian exploration of the urban and suburban landscape.  Scholar Duncan Hay asserts that Sinclair's work does not represent the utopian and revolutionary foundations of Situationist practice, and instead 'finds its expression as a literary mode, a position that would have appeared paradoxical to its original practitioners'.:3 Sinclair has distanced himself from the term, declaring it a 'very nasty set of branding'.:19 Will Self also contributed to the popularisation of the term in Great Britain through a column in the Saturday magazine of the national broadsheet The Independent.:11; The column, which started out in the British Airways inflight magazine, ran in The Independent until October 2008. 

Sinclair and similar thinkers draw on a longstanding British literary tradition of the exploration of urban landscapes, predating the Situationists, found in the work of writers William Blake, Arthur Machen, and Thomas de Quincey.  The nature and history of London were a central focus of these writers, utilising romantic, gothic, and occult ideas to describe and transform the city.  Sinclair drew on this tradition combined with his own explorations as a way of criticising modern developments of urban space in the key text Lights Out for the Territory.  Peter Ackroyd's bestselling London: A Biography was partially based on similar sources. Merlin Coverley gives prominence to this literary tradition in his book Psychogeography (2006). Coverley recognises the situationist origins of psychogeographic practice are sometimes overshadowed by literary traditions, but that they had a shared tradition through writers like Edgar Allan Poe, Daniel Defoe, and Charles Baudelaire.

The documentaries of filmmaker Patrick Keiller are also considered to be an example of psychogeography.

The concepts and themes seen in the popular comics writer Alan Moore in From Hell are also now seen as significant works of psychogeography.  Other key figures in this version of the idea are Walter Benjamin, J. G. Ballard, and Nicholas Hawksmoor.  Part of this development saw increasing use of ideas and terminology by some psychogeographers from Fortean and occult areas including earth mysteries, ley lines and chaos magic, a course pioneered by Sinclair.  A core element in virtually all these developments remains a dissatisfaction with the nature and design of the modern environment and a desire to make the everyday world more interesting.

Aleksandar Janicijevic, the initiator of the Urban Squares Initiative, defined psychogeography for the group in the following terms: "The subjective analysis–mental reaction, to neighbourhood behaviours related to geographic location. A chronological process based on the order of appearance of observed topics, with the time delayed inclusion of other relevant instances". In 2013 Aleksandar Janicijevic published "Urbis – Language of the urban fabric" as a visual attempt to rediscover lost or neglected urban symbols. In 2015 another book was published, "MyPsychogeography", an attempt to synthesize sketches and ideas which have informed his art practice.

Groups involved in psychogeography
Psychogeography is practiced both experimentally and formally in groups or associations, which sometimes consist of just one member.  Known groups, some of whom are still operating, include:

Bay Area Rapid Transit Psychogeographical Association
Glowlab
Loiterers Resistance Movement
London Psychogeographical Association
Nottingham Psychogeographical Unit
Providence Initiative for Psychogeographic Studies
The Unilalia Group (see Unilalianism)
The Workshop for Non-Linear Architecture

Noted psychogeographers

Peter Ackroyd
Michèle Bernstein
Pat Barker
Paul Conneally
Guy Debord
Stewart Home
Jacqueline de Jong
Robert Macfarlane
Geoff Nicholson
Iain Sinclair
Laura Oldfield Ford
Nick Papadimitriou
Will Self
Cathy Turner (artist)
Jean Rolin
Philippe Vasset

Applications for mobile devices 
A number of applications have been made for mobile devices to facilitate dérives:

 Dérive app
 Serendipitor 
 Drift
Dérive

See also

Desire path
Ecocriticism
Edgelands
Environmental psychology
Flâneur
Graffiti
Hypergraphy
Landscape zodiac
Parkour
Psychohistory
Psychonaut
Rhizome (philosophy)
Schizophrenia
Social trail
Urban acupuncture
Urban exploration
Wayfinding

References

Sources

Further reading

 Balsebre, Gianluigi (September 1995). Della critica radicale. Bibliografia ragionata sul'internazionale situazionista con testi inediti in italiano (in Italian). Bologna: Grafton.
 Balsebre, Gianluigi (1997). Il territorio dello spettacolo (in Italian). Bologna: Potlatch.
 Coverley, Merlin (2006). Psychogeography. London: Pocket Essentials.
 Debord, Guy, ed. (1996). Guy Debord presente Potlatch. Paris: Folio.
 Ford, Simon (2005). The Situationist International: A User's Guide. London: Black Dog Publishing.
 Home, Stewart (1997). Mind Invaders: A Reader in Psychic Warfare, Cultural Sabotage and Semiotic Terrorism. London: Serpent's Tail.
 Larry Miller's Flux-Tour at NYU's Grey Art Gallery. https://greyartgallery.nyu.edu/2011/11/performing-in-larry-millers-flux-tour-at-the-grey/
 George Maciunas Flux-Tours. https://www.fondazionebonotto.org/en/collection/fluxus/maciunasgeorge/10/1520.html
 Janicijevic, Aleksandar (June 2008). "Psychogeography Now - Window to the Urban Future". (Toronto) (International Journal for Neighbourhood Renewal, Liverpool, UK)
 Law, Larry; Chris Gray, editors (1998). Leaving the 20th Century: the Incomplete Work of the Situationist International. London: Rebel P.
 Sadler, Simon (1998). The Situationist City. Cambridge: MIT P.
 Smith, Phil. Mythogeography: A Guide to Walking Sideways
 Vazquez, Daniele (2010). Manuale di Psicogeografia. Cuneo: Nerosubianco edizioni. 
 Wark, McKenzie (2008). 50 Years of Recuperation of the Situationist International. New York, Princeton Architectural.

External links

Guide psychogeographique de Paris. Guy Debord's famous map of Paris
Interview with Merlin Coverley
4th World Congress of Psychogeography- annual conference

 
Human geography
Cultural geography
Situationist International
Performance art
Underground culture
Social philosophy
Culture jamming
Walking